Sverre Gunnar Strandli (30 November 1925 – 4 March 1985) was a Norwegian hammer thrower, who won the gold medal at the European Championships in 1950 and the silver medal in 1954.

At the Summer Olympics Strandli finished seventh in Helsinki 1952, eighth in Melbourne 1956 and eleventh in Rome 1960. He was the Norwegian Olympic flagbearer in 1960. At the 1962 European Championships he did not qualify for the final. He became Norwegian champion in the years 1949–1954, 1956–1957 and 1960–1962, and took one national title in shot put, in 1954. For his European Championships victory Strandli was selected Norwegian Sportsperson of the Year in 1950.

Strandli established two world records in hammer throw, both in Oslo. The first record of 61.25 metres came in September 1952 and the second of 62.36 metres was established a year later. The world record stood until August 1954, when Mikhail Krivonosov improved it to 63.34 m. For his second world record Strandli was selected Norwegian Sportsperson of the Year for a second time in 1953. He later set a personal best mark of 63.88 metres, in October 1962 in Trondheim, but at that point Hal Connolly had improved the world record to 70.67 metres.

References

External links

 

1925 births
1985 deaths
Norwegian male hammer throwers
Athletes (track and field) at the 1952 Summer Olympics
Athletes (track and field) at the 1956 Summer Olympics
Athletes (track and field) at the 1960 Summer Olympics
Olympic athletes of Norway
European Athletics Championships medalists
Sportspeople from Kongsvinger